My Radio may refer to:

"My Radio", song by J.K. (singer) from List of RPM number-one dance singles of 1996
"My Radio", song by Sandra Chambers 1998
"My Radio", song by Stars from Nightsongs (Stars album) 
"My Radio", song by Solvent on Ghostly International's 2002 compilation album Disco Nouveau
"My Radio", song by Deborah Cox from Deborah Cox (album)
"My Radio", song by Shaya (singer)
"My Radio", song by the band Pavement Westing (By Musket and Sextant)
"My Radio", song by Black Drawing Chalks Life is a Big Holiday for Us
 A radio station in Zhengzhou